Squalidus intermedius is a species of cyprinid fish endemic to the Yellow River in China.

References

Squalidus
Taxa named by John Treadwell Nichols
Fish described in 1929